Bishops Lydeard Association Football Club is a football club based in Bishops Lydeard, near Taunton, in Somerset, England.

History
The club was established in 1912 and later became members of the Taunton & District League. They won both the League Cup  and the Seward Memorial Cup in 1952–53, and were Division Two champions in 1960–61, as well as winning the Seward Memorial Cup for a second time. The club won the League Cup again in 1988–89 and went on to win the Division One title in 1991–92. The following season saw them retain the Division One title and win the League Cup, with the club retaining the League Cup in 1993–94. After winning the League Cup again in 2000–01, they won Division One for a third time in 2002–03, earning promotion to Division Three of the Somerset County League.

Bishops Lydeard were Division Three champions in 2004–05 and were promoted to Division Two. The following season saw the club win the Division Two & Three League Cup, as well as finishing second in Division Two, earning promotion to Division One. They were Division One champions in 2007–08 and were promoted to the Premier Division. The club finished as runners-up in the Premier Division in 2009–10, and after winning the division in 2015–16, they were promoted to Division One of the Western League.

Honours
Somerset County League
Premier Division champions 2015–16
Division One champions 2007–08
Division Three champions 2004–05
Division Two & Three League Cup winners 2005–06
Taunton & District League
Division One champions 1991–92, 1992–93, 2002–03
Division Two champions 1960–61
League Cup winners 1952–53, 1988–89, 1992–93, 1993–94, 2000–01
Seward Memorial Cup winners 1952–53, 1960–61
Rowbarton Charity Cup winners 1961–62

Records
Best FA Vase performance: Second qualifying round, 2018–19

References

External links
Official website

Football clubs in England
Football clubs in Somerset
1912 establishments in England
Association football clubs established in 1912
Taunton & District Saturday Football League
Somerset County League
Western Football League